Celtic Woman is an all-female Irish musical ensemble conceived and created by David Kavanagh and Sharon Browne. They became successful internationally by releasing their music to a worldwide audience.  David Downes, a former musical director of the Irish stage show Riverdance. In 2004, Downes recruited five Irish female musicians who had not previously performed together, vocalists Chloë Agnew, Órla Fallon, Lisa Kelly and Méav Ní Mhaolchatha, and fiddler Máiréad Nesbitt, as the first lineup of the group that he named "Celtic Woman". Downes chose a repertoire that ranged from traditional Celtic tunes to modern songs.

The show was meant to be a one-time event held in Dublin, Ireland, but multiple airings on PBS helped boost the group's popularity.

The group's line-up has changed over the years. Fourteen albums have been released under the name "Celtic Woman": Celtic Woman, Celtic Woman: A Christmas Celebration, Celtic Woman: A New Journey, Celtic Woman: The Greatest Journey, Celtic Woman: Songs from the Heart, Celtic Woman: Lullaby, Celtic Woman: Believe, Celtic Woman: Home for Christmas, Celtic Woman: Emerald - Musical Gems, Celtic Woman: Destiny, Celtic Woman: Voices of Angels, Celtic Woman: Ancient Land, Celtic Woman: The Magic of Christmas, and Celtic Woman: Postcards from Ireland. The group has undertaken a number of world tours. Cumulatively, albums by Celtic Woman have sold over nine million records worldwide. Celtic Woman has been described as being "Riverdance for the voice."

Celtic Woman has been named Billboard World Album Artist of the Year six times.

Tours 
Celtic Woman has performed numerous tours in North America, with additional ones overseas. The group appeared live in more than a dozen US cities in 2005 for their original album debut, Celtic Woman The Show. This was followed by all five members' solo albums recorded between 2000 and 2004 being released in the US on 10 January 2006.

The group toured the United States twice with their A New Journey tour, visiting 88 cities in 2007 and over 75 cities in 2008. In early April 2008 it was announced that The High Kings would be opening the act for the group through June 2008. The tour began on 14 February 2007 in Tampa with initial dates announced through 29 June 2007. New dates for Europe running 22 September 22 to 9 October 2007 were announced in May 2007 along with fall North American dates running 10 October to 17 November 2007 and some Japan dates. The tour finished on 6 October 2008 in Amsterdam.

The 2009 Isle of Hope tour was announced in late 2008. It began in the Spring of 2009 and finished on 22 November 2009.

The 2010 tour called Songs from the Heart, featured some of the same music and some new music. The tour featured Chloë Agnew, Lisa Kelly, Lynn Hilary, Alex Sharpe, and Máiréad Nesbitt. It began in February 2010.

A second "Songs from the Heart" tour opened in February 2011 with Agnew, Kelly, new member Lisa Lambe, and Nesbitt and consisted of about 80 concerts in North America in spring 2011 and 10 performances in Germany and Austria during summer 2011.

The Christmas Symphony Tour featuring songs from their Christmas Album A Christmas Celebration took place during December 2011.

The Believe 2012 North American Tour ran between February 2012 and April 2012. Following directly onto this, the BELIEVE European tour took place between May and June 2012. Lisa Kelly, who was expecting her fourth child, did not participate in the 2012 tours, and was replaced by Susan McFadden, the younger sister of former Westlife member Brian McFadden.

Another Symphony Tour was announced for the 2012 Christmas season, featuring Agnew, Lambe, Nesbitt and McFadden. The tour began on 1 December and continued on till 22 December.

Celtic Woman took "Believe" on tour again from February to June 2013, with the same line-up.  On 15 January 2013, Lisa Kelly announced her intentions to open "The Lisa Kelly Voice Academy", located in Peachtree City, GA, and confirmed that she would not be returning to Celtic Woman.  Her husband, Scott Porter, also announced his departure as CEO of Celtic Woman.

On 5 August 2013, Chloë Agnew announced that she was taking a break from Celtic Woman to focus on solo projects. She was replaced by Derry-born singer Mairéad Carlin for the second "Believe" European tour.

Celtic Woman took "Believe" to Europe in October 2013 and visited the US on their Symphony Tour in December 2013. The lineup featured Carlin, McFadden, Lambe and Nesbitt. The Australian Tour for "Believe", previously scheduled for September 2013, was rescheduled to January 2014.

Celtic Woman toured in the US from February to June 2014 on their Emerald Tour to promote their new album called Celtic Woman: Emerald Musical Gems. Lynn Hilary came back for the Emerald Tour as Lisa Lambe left in mid-March for a role in the play Breaking Dad, Ross O'Carroll-Kelly's sequel to Between Foxrock and a Hard Place." As well as the US, Celtic Woman visited Brazil, the UK, and Europe in Autumn 2014 on their Emerald Tour, making their debut in Brazil and the UK.

Celtic Woman toured the US for their "Symphony Tour" in December 2014.

They returned to the U.S. for their Decade 10th Anniversary Tour in March 2015 to celebrate the group's 10th anniversary. Their November 2014 Emerald European Tour was rescheduled to February 2015 and became part of the Decade 10th Anniversary Tour instead.

They visited Australia for the Decade 10th Anniversary Tour in September 2015 for the first time since January 2014 and returned to the UK in November 2015.

The Destiny World Tour was from 4 March – 29 October 2016.

The Voices of Angels World Tour was from 2 March – 2 November 2017.

On 6 October 2017, Celtic Woman officially announced their 2018 tour, the Homecoming World Tour. The North American leg of the Homecoming Tour ran from 1 March 2018 – 17 June 2018.

On 31 July 2018, the group announced The Best of Christmas Tour, which ran from 26 November – 22 December 2018.

On 17 October 2018, the group announced the Ancient Land Tour, which ran from 28 February 2019 - 18 November 2019.

On 4 October 2019, The Celebration 15th Anniversary Tour was announced to run from 27 February 2020 – 7 June 2020 to celebrate the group's 15th Anniversary but was cut short in March due to the coronavirus pandemic. On 13 March 2020, an announcement was made that the cancelled dates would be rescheduled. On 20 March 2020, the rescheduled Celebration 15th Anniversary Tour was announced to run from 25 February 2021 – 4 June 2021 and more tour dates would be announced soon. However, on 7 January 2021, it was announced that the rescheduled Celebration 15th Anniversary Tour was postponed to spring 2022. On 20 April 2021, it was announced that the rescheduled Celebration 15th Anniversary Tour was renamed to the Postcards from Ireland Tour, which ran from 24 February 2022 to 6 June 2022.

On 30 June 2022, the group announced the A Christmas Symphony tour, which will run from 2 December 2022 to 22 December 2022.

Tours
Celtic Woman: The Show (2005–2006)
A New Journey Tour (2007–2008)
Isle of Hope Tour (2009)
Songs from the Heart Tour (2010–2011)
A Christmas Celebration: The Symphony Tour (2011)
Believe Tour (2012–2013)
Home for Christmas Tour (2012–2016)
Emerald – Musical Gems Tour (2014)
10th Anniversary Tour (2015)
Destiny Tour (2016)
Voices of Angels World Tour (2017–2018)
Homecoming Tour (2018)
The Best of Christmas Tour (2018)
Ancient Land Tour (2019)
The Magic of Christmas Tour (2019)
Celebration: 15th Anniversary Tour (2020)
Postcards from Ireland Tour (2022)
A Christmas Symphony Tour (2022)

Albums 
Celtic Woman was taped on 15 September 2004 for PBS television at The Helix in Dublin in front of a sold-out audience. Organized by producer Sharon Browne, Chairman & CEO Dave Kavanagh, television producer and director Avril MacRory, and musical director and composer David Downes, this performance was first broadcast on PBS during March 2005 in the United States. Within weeks the group's eponymous debut album, Celtic Woman, reached No. 1 on Billboard's World Music chart, eventually breaking Andrea Bocelli's long-standing record of chart-topping longevity on 22 July 2006 by having stayed at No. 1 for 68 weeks. The album held the top position on the Billboard World Music chart for 81 weeks total. Much of the group's success in America has been credited to the extensive PBS publicity throughout 2005. The live performance at The Helix was released on DVD alongside the studio album.

The release of the second album, Celtic Woman: A Christmas Celebration, on 19 October 2006 knocked their first album to the No. 2 spot on the World Music chart.

In preparation for their third studio album, Celtic Woman performed at Slane Castle in County Meath, Ireland, on 23 and 24 August 2006, with this show airing on PBS during December 2006. The studio album, titled Celtic Woman: A New Journey, was released on 30 January 2007. As with their debut, the live performance was released on DVD simultaneously. This album immediately hit the Billboard 200 at No. 4 and the Billboard World Music chart at No. 1, moving their previous two releases down a notch and securing the top three positions on that chart for the group.

In response to the popularity of the performance at Slane Castle in 2006, PBS aired a special concert of Celtic Woman performing again in The Helix Theatre, Dublin, Ireland on 7 December 2007. This performance included songs from the group's second album, Celtic Woman: A Christmas Celebration.

A fourth album, Celtic Woman: The Greatest Journey, was released on 28 October 2008.

The group's fifth album, Celtic Woman: Songs from the Heart, was released 26 January 2010. It peaked at No. 48 in July 2010 on the ARIA Top 50 Albums chart. For the album, PBS television presented a special concert starting 28 November 2009. It was taped in HD at Powerscourt House and Gardens in Enniskerry, County Wicklow. It included a 27-member film orchestra, Discovery Gospel choir, 12-member Aontas Choir, 10-member Extreme Rhythm Drummers with an 11-piece bagpipe ensemble.

The group released their sixth album, Lullaby, available through PBS pledge or the QVC shopping website.
On 15 February 2011, it was released by other major retailers as a limited edition album. It reached No. 1 on the World Charts and No. 3 on the Children's Charts, a first for Celtic Woman.

The group filmed a new special on 6 and 7 September 2011 at the Fox Theater in Atlanta, Georgia for PBS broadcast and DVD release. It is titled Celtic Woman: Believe. The show aired on PBS stations on 3 December 2011. The CD/DVD was released on 24 January 2012.

On 9 October 2012, the group released its second worldwide Christmas album Home for Christmas. This album features the voices of Lisa Lambe, Chloë Agnew, Meav Ni Mhaolchatha, and Mairead Nesbitt on the fiddle. Another Christmas album, Celtic Woman: Silent Night was released on the same day for the United States exclusively.

In July 2013, Celtic Woman released a promotional video on its YouTube channel for a new PBS special, due to be screened in early 2014. On 24 February 2014, Celtic Woman released a new CD/DVD set and PBS Special, called Celtic Woman: Emerald - Musical Gems. It features Lisa Lambe, Chloë Agnew, Mairead Nesbitt, and Susan McFadden.  The DVD was filmed in April 2013 at a tour stop in South Bend, Indiana and was aired on PBS, starting in March.

On 29 May 2015, the group released an album called Solo featuring ten of the former and current members. On 10 July 2015, the group released an album called Decade: The Songs, The Show, The Traditions, The Classics featuring all of the former and current members. The albums were released to commemorate the group's 10th Anniversary.

In August 2015, the group filmed a DVD / TV special and recorded an accompanying album called Celtic Woman: Destiny, the first for Mairead Carlin and Éabha McMahon. Nesbitt was the only founding member on the album, although Meav Ni Mhaolchatha appeared and sang as a guest. Destiny was nominated for Best World Music Album at the 59th Annual Grammy Awards. This was the first Grammy nomination for the group.

In August 2016, the group recorded an album called Celtic Woman: Voices of Angels. The album was the first to feature Tara McNeill and was also the first album to feature none of the founding members, although Meav Ni Mhaolchatha again appeared as a guest.

Celtic Woman recorded a live album, Celtic Woman: Homecoming – Live from Ireland, at the 3Arena in Dublin on 2 September 2017. The album released in January 2018. It was the first album released by the group to consist entirely of live tracks.

On 19 July 2018, Celtic Woman announced a new TV special and DVD, to be recorded on 13–14 September 2018 at Johnstown Castle in Wexford, Ireland. This was the group's first outdoor TV special in nine years. The following day, the group announced a studio album to accompany the DVD. The DVD and album were named Ancient Land.

The Magic of Christmas was released on 25 October 2019 in North America and on 8 November 2019 internationally.

On 21 February 2020, Celtic Woman announced their album Celebration: 15 Years of Music and Magic to commemorate the group's 15th anniversary. It was digitally released on 27 February 2020, while the CD was released on 27 March 2020.

On 10 September 2021, Celtic Woman announced their album Postcards from Ireland, which was released on 29 October 2021.

On 1 November 2022, Celtic Woman announced their EP Christmas Cards from Ireland, which was released on digital platforms on 4 November 2022.

Members

Present  

 Hannah Traynor 
Originally from Kilkenny, she replaced Chloë Agnew. She will be touring with the group on their upcoming A Christmas Symphony tour. 
 Tara McNeill  Originally from Antrim, she replaced Máiréad Nesbitt on the group's South Africa, South Korea and China Destiny tour shows in 2016. Her debut album with Celtic Woman was 2016's "Voices of Angels".
 Megan Walsh Originally from Trim and Navan, she replaced Susan McFadden. Walsh debuted with the group on the studio album and TV special "Ancient Land", released in fall 2018.
 Muirgen O'Mahony
Originally from Cork, she replaced Mairéad Carlin. She debuted with the group on the studio album and TV special "Postcards from Ireland", released in fall 2021.

Former 

 Órla Fallon  Órla Fallon is an Irish soloist and singer-songwriter. In 2004, she was invited by composer David Downes and became one of the founding members of the group. Fallon has performed the harp as well as singing. She was featured in the self-titled debut album Celtic Woman, Celtic Woman: A Christmas Celebration, and Celtic Woman: A New Journey, as well as in the tie-in PBS television specials and DVDs filmed in 2004, 2007, and 2006 respectively. She also toured with the group in 2005 on the inaugural North American, and the A New Journey tours. In 2009, Fallon announced that she would be leaving the group to spend time with her family and was replaced by Alex Sharpe.
 Lynn Hilary  Lynn Hilary is an Irish singer, guitarist, and songwriter. In 2007, original member Méav Ní Mhaolchatha decided to leave the group to focus on her solo career. Hilary joined the group as Ní Mhaolchatha's replacement in time for the Fall A New Journey tour, which started on 10 October 2007 in Estero, FL. She was the first new member to join the group since its inception in 2004. She left Celtic Woman in November 2010 to continue performing in Ireland. On 14 February 2014, it was announced that Lynn would be returning for the groups Emerald tour in March while Lisa Lambe took a short 'leave of absence.' In early 2015, it was announced that Lynn would be touring with the show again in April and May of that year for the 10th Anniversary Tour. She has been a member of Anúna and continues to perform and record with the ensemble, most recently on their album "Revelation" (2015). In 2016 she and former Celtic Woman member Alex Sharpe formed the group CaraNua.
 Lisa Kelly  Lisa Kelly is a singer of both classical and Celtic music. She was a founding member of the group. During the A New Journey tour in 2008, Kelly took a break for the birth of her daughter and was replaced by Alex Sharpe. In December 2011, Lisa announced she would be taking another maternity leave and would not participate in the 2012 Believe Tour. She was replaced by Susan McFadden. In January 2013 Lisa announced her departure and moved to Peachtree City, Georgia, USA, where she announced the opening of The Lisa Kelly Voice Academy, which is run in conjunction with her husband Scott Porter, the former CEO of Celtic Woman Ltd.
 Lisa Lambe  Lisa Lambe is an Irish singer and actress. After the Songs From the Heart Tour, in November 2010, Lynn Hilary announced she was leaving the group to return to Ireland. Celtic Woman later announced that Lambe would join the group as part of the spring 2011 tour lineup. Lambe said that she was "Delighted to be joining Celtic Woman! It is a privilege to be part of this amazing show and I am looking forward to it being an incredible experience." Lambe left the group in late 2014 to continue her solo career.
Susan McFadden  Susan McFadden is an Irish actress and singer. She was named as a replacement for Lisa Kelly, who was then going on maternity leave. She debuted with Celtic Woman in February 2012 at Nashville, Tennessee for the kickoff of the "Believe" North American Tour and continued with the European, Australian and South African Tours in 2012. She became a full-time member after Lisa Kelly announced her departure in January 2013. Susan announced her maternity leave on 12 August 2018. Susan rejoined for a few shows in October 2019, filling in for Mairead Carlin while she recovered from appendicitis. On 22 January 2020, it was announced that Susan will be performing in six shows for the spring tour in the cities where Chloë Agnew will not be appearing in. but the tour was cut short due the pandemic. However, it was announced Susan would be performing in seven shows on the Postcards from Ireland Tour filling in for Chloë Agnew as well as doing the last few shows on the Postcards from Ireland Tour to fill in for Megan Walsh who went back to Ireland to attend a family emergency.
 Éabha McMahon  Éabha was born in Dublin. She debuted with Celtic Woman in the album and DVD / TV special Celtic Woman: Destiny in 2015. On 22 January 2020, it was announced that McMahon was taking a leave from the group to work on her own projects. Chloë Agnew returned to the group to take her place.
Méav Ní Mhaolchatha  Méav Ní Mhaolchatha is an Irish singer, songwriter and recording artist specialising in the traditional music of her homeland. She was a member of Anúna from 1994 to 1998. She gained musical stardom as a founding member of the group in 2004. Her singing is a prominent element of Celtic Woman's first three albums, Celtic Woman, Celtic Woman: A Christmas Celebration, and Celtic Woman: A New Journey. In 2005, Méav was expecting her first child and took maternity leave and was replaced by Deirdre Shannon. In 2006, she returned to record the New Journey CD and DVD and toured extensively with the group in the US and Japan in 2006 and 2007. She has been featured in Celtic Woman: The Greatest Journey Essential Collection. In 2007, following the filming of Celtic Woman's Christmas DVD at the Helix, Dublin, she left the group to concentrate on her solo career. She appeared with Celtic Woman again when she featured as a guest soloist on their Christmas album Home for Christmas. Méav was also featured in the Celtic Woman PBS special, "Home for Christmas", which was recorded on 7 August 2013. Before the recording of Destiny, she became Celtic Woman's vocal director and occasionally appears as a special guest/substitute.
 Máiréad Nesbitt  Máiréad Nesbitt is an Irish classical and Celtic music performer, most notably as a violinist. In 2004, she was invited to play for a performance at the Helix Theatre in Dublin, called "Celtic Woman." She is featured on nine of the group's albums to date: Celtic Woman, Celtic Woman: A Christmas Celebration, Celtic Woman: A New Journey, Celtic Woman: The Greatest Journey, Celtic Woman: Songs from the Heart, Celtic Woman: Lullaby, Celtic Woman: Believe, and Celtic Woman: Home for Christmas, and Destiny. On 7 August 2016, it was announced that Nesbitt would be stepping away to focus on her own projects.
 Deirdre Shannon  Deirdre Shannon is an Irish singer who has also toured with other Celtic music groups, such as Anúna, and Celtic Thunder. She has also been a principal singer in the group but was never featured in the studio DVDs. She joined the group as a stand-in during the first Celtic Woman tour in 2005 after Méav's first child was born.
 Alex Sharpe  Alex Sharpe is an Irish performer known for her musical roles. When founding member Lisa Kelly went on maternity leave, Sharpe became a temporary member in 2008. In 2009, Sharpe became a permanent member, in effect replacing Órla Fallon. She has toured with the group on their 2009 Isle of Hope tour, and recorded the CD and DVD for Songs from the Heart, released in January 2010. The group toured North America from February to May 2010 on their 'Songs from the Heart' tour. After the tour finished, Sharpe announced she would be leaving to be with her family full-time. In early 2015 it was announced that she would rejoin Celtic Woman for two months (May and June) of their Decade 10th Anniversary tour. In 2016, she and former Celtic Woman member Lynn Hilary formed the group  CaraNua. In 2018, Alex rejoined Celtic Woman for 12 shows of the North American Homecoming tour to fill in for Susan McFadden who went back to Ireland to attend a family emergency.
 Hayley Westenra  Hayley Westenra is a New Zealand singer, classical crossover artist, songwriter and UNICEF Ambassador. She joined in August 2006 and was featured on Celtic Woman: A New Journey CD and DVD, toured on their 2007 Spring Tour, and was also featured on their DVD, The Greatest Journey: Essential Collection, released in 2008. After the Spring Tour ended, Hayley left to return to her solo career.
 Mairéad Carlin   Máiréad Carlin is a singer from Derry. From August 2013, she replaced Chloë Agnew, who would be working on solo projects. In January 2021 She announced via her social channels that she had decided to leave Celtic Woman to pursue other projects.
 Chloë Agnew Chloë Agnew is an Irish singer. She appeared as part of the group at The Helix in Dublin in 2004 as its youngest member. On 5 August 2013, the Celtic Woman website announced that Agnew would be taking a break to focus on solo projects. Her position was filled by Derry-born singer Mairéad Carlin. On 22 January 2020, it was announced that Agnew was returning to the group to fill in for McMahon during the Celtic Woman Celebration spring tour, but the tour was cut short due the pandemic. However, Agnew announced that she would participate in the Postcards from Ireland Tour as well as the Postcards from Ireland album and TV special/DVD. On 19 August 2022, Agnew announced that she would be taking a break from the group once again to focus on solo projects.

Membership 
The original performers in Celtic Woman were Chloë Agnew, Órla Fallon, Lisa Kelly, Méav Ní Mhaolchatha, and Máiréad Nesbitt. During Méav's pregnancy in 2005, Deirdre Shannon was selected to fill her place during tours. Méav returned to the group in time to record A New Journey and tour for that album, coinciding with Deirdre's departure from the group in February 2006.

The second line-up change was announced on 6 September 2006, with the announcement that Hayley Westenra officially joined Celtic Woman on 24 August 2006. As well as being featured on the album and DVD for A New Journey, Hayley alternated with Méav during tour events to maintain the live five-person line-up.

On 20 August 2007, Méav left Celtic Woman to focus on her solo career. Méav's replacement, Lynn Hilary, made her first appearance on 10 October 2007 in Estero, Florida, United States.

In December 2007, Lisa Kelly, who was expecting her third child in 2008, took maternity leave from the group. Alex Sharpe filled her position on the A New Journey tour during this leave.

It was announced on the group's website in 2009 that Órla Fallon was taking a full break to spend time with her family and to focus on recording a new solo album, and that as a result of this, Alex would be replacing Órla as a member of Celtic Woman.

For the 2009 Isle of Hope Tour, the group comprised vocalists Chloë Agnew, Lynn Hilary, Lisa Kelly, and Alex Sharpe; and fiddler Máiréad Nesbitt. This group completed the entire 2009 tour as well as the first leg of the Songs from the Heart tour, from February to May 2010, with this line-up. After the tour ended, it was announced that Alex Sharpe would take a full-time break from Celtic Woman to spend time with her family.

After the Songs from the Heart tour, in November 2010, Lynn Hilary announced that she was leaving the group to return to Ireland. Singer and actress Lisa Lambe joined the group as a replacement for Lynn in early 2011.

In December 2011, Lisa Kelly announced that she would be taking maternity leave from the group after the "Symphony Tour" was over. The group's website announced in January 2012 that actress Susan McFadden would be filling in for Kelly until she returned to the group. However, Kelly announced the opening of "The Lisa Kelly Voice Academy" in Peachtree City, Georgia, in January 2013 say that she was moving on from performing to teaching. Susan has since become a full member of the line-up and appeared on the new Celtic Woman PBS special and DVD Emerald, released in early 2014.

In 2012, Méav Ní Mhaolchatha returned briefly to Celtic Woman to record Celtic Woman: Home for Christmas, the first time she had appeared with the group since her departure in 2007. She announced that she would return to the group again, temporary, in August 2013 to film the Celtic Woman: Home for Christmas PBS show and DVD.

Shortly before the "Home for Christmas" DVD show, Chloë Agnew announced she would be taking a break from Celtic Woman to work on solo projects and was not featured in the PBS special. On 23 August 2013, it was announced that Derry-born singer Mairéad Carlin would be taking Chloë's place.

Shortly before the beginning of the Emerald Tour on 14 February 2014, management announced that Lisa Lambe would be leaving the tour at the beginning of March, with Lynn Hilary returning to take her place.  Lambe was slated to return during the summer, though no specific date was given.

In late 2014, Lambe shared she would be leaving Celtic Woman for a while to work on a solo album. She announced that her departure was permanent in early 2015 to promote her solo album and tour. Lynn Hilary again returned and took Lambe's place. It was later announced both Hilary and Alex Sharpe would be returning for the Decade 10th Anniversary tour along with Méav.

On 11 August 2015, it was announced that Éabha McMahon was joining Celtic Woman as a principal singer.

On 7 August 2016, it was announced that long-time member Máiréad Nesbitt was stepping away from Celtic Woman to focus on her own projects. Tara McNeill, a violinist, harpist, and singer, was announced as a new member of Celtic Woman.

From 11 to 23 March 2018, McFadden took a leave from the Celtic Woman: Homecoming tour to attend to a family emergency. Sharpe temporarily took McFadden's place in the lineup. McFadden returned to the tour on 24 March 2018 and remained with the group until the end of the tour.

On 12 August 2018, it was announced that McFadden, expecting her first child, was taking a leave from the group. On 16 August 2018, Megan Walsh was announced as a new member of the group, taking McFadden's place. In October 2019, Susan McFadden returned for a few shows on the group's European Tour while Mairéad Carlin recovered from appendicitis.

On 22 January 2020, it was announced that Éabha McMahon was taking a leave from the group to pursue her own projects. Chloë Agnew returned to the group for the US Celebration tour to take McMahon's place for the majority of the tour, and Susan McFadden would fill in for the dates Agnew would not be performing on.  On 13 January 2021, it was announced that Mairéad Carlin was taking a leave from the group to pursue other projects. On 4 June 2021, Muirgen O’Mahony was announced as a new member of the group, taking Carlin's place.  On 19 August 2022, it was announced that   Chloë Agnew was taking another leave from the group to focus on more solo projects. On 11 October 2022, Hannah Traynor was announced as the newest member of the group taking Agnew's place.

When asked how the group members got along, founding former member Lisa Kelly responded,
"We get along because we're so different. Chloë Agnew is hip, Méav Ní Mhaolchatha is rational, Orla Fallon is angelic, and Máiréad Nesbitt is energetic."
According to Chloë Agnew, the friendship among the vocalists was the number one question they were asked. She explained:
"I think people are always looking for a 'Desperate Housewives' story, that they all hate each other and nobody actually gets along. It's all for show. And the truth of the matter is, it's not. The reality is we do all get along. The five of us are like sisters, best friends."

Member Timeline

Discography

Awards and honours 
In 2007, Celtic Woman won an EBBA Award. Each year the European Border Breakers Awards (EBBA) recognize the success of ten emerging artists or groups who reached audiences outside their own countries with their first internationally released album in the past year. Celtic Woman: Destiny received a nomination for the 59th (2017) Grammy Awards in the "Best World Music Album" category.

References

External links 

Official website

Celtic music groups
Irish folk musical groups
Musical groups established in 2004
All-female bands